The Rainmaker is a 1956 American romance western film directed by Joseph Anthony and adapted by N. Richard Nash from his 1954 play The Rainmaker. The film tells the story of a middle-aged woman, suffering from unrequited love for the local town sheriff; however, she falls for a con man who comes to town with the promise that he can make it rain. It stars Burt Lancaster, Katharine Hepburn, Wendell Corey, Lloyd Bridges and Earl Holliman. Holliman won a Golden Globe Award for his performance.

The Rainmaker has been remade twice. The first time as a television film of the same name in 1982 directed by John Frankenheimer. The second time in Hindi as Thodasa Roomani Ho Jayen in 1990.

Plot
During the Depression era in the Midwest, con man Bill Starbuck acts as a rainmaker, but is chased out of town after town.  One day, he arrives in a drought-ridden rural town in Kansas and shows up at the door of spinsterish Lizzie Curry and the rest of the Curry clan. Lizzie keeps house for her father, H.C., and two brothers on the family cattle ranch.  As their farm languishes under the devastating drought, Lizzie's family worries about her marriage prospects more than about their dying cattle. Prior to Starbuck's arrival, Lizzie was expecting Sheriff File, for whom she harbors a secret yen, though he declined the family's invitation to dinner. Starbuck promises to bring rain in exchange for money.  Against Lizzie's protests, H.C. goes for the deal out of desperation for rain even though he thinks Starbuck is a con. Starbuck is exposed, but the Curry clan stands up for him, leading to both Starbuck and File finally declaring for Lizzie. In the end, Lizzie gets her man, and of course, it rains.

Cast
 Burt Lancaster as Bill Starbuck
 Katharine Hepburn as Lizzie Curry
 Wendell Corey as Deputy Sheriff J.S. File
 Lloyd Bridges as Noah Curry
 Earl Holliman as Jim Curry
 Cameron Prud'Homme as H.C. Curry
 Wallace Ford as Sheriff Howard Thomas
 Yvonne Lime as Snookie Maguire

Awards

Academy Awards
Nominations

Best Actress: Katharine Hepburn
Best Music (Scoring of a Dramatic or Comedy Picture): Alex North

Golden Globe Awards
Won:

Golden Globe for Best Supporting Actor: Earl Holliman

Nominations

Golden Globe for Best Motion Picture - Drama
Golden Globe for Best Actor: Burt Lancaster
Golden Globe for Best Actress: Katharine Hepburn

See also
List of American films of 1956

References

External links

1956 films
1956 directorial debut films
1950s English-language films
1956 Western (genre) films
American Western (genre) films
1950s romance films
American films based on plays
American romance films
Films about con artists
Films directed by Joseph Anthony
Films featuring a Best Supporting Actor Golden Globe winning performance
Films produced by Hal B. Wallis
Films scored by Alex North
Films set in the 1930s
Films set in Kansas
Films with screenplays by N. Richard Nash
Paramount Pictures films
1950s American films